Franco Peccenini (born 16 August 1953 in Palestrina) is a retired Italian professional football player.

Born in Palestrina, Peccenini began playing football with Roma. He made his Serie A debut against Varese on 12 March 1972. He played 12 seasons (192 games) in the Serie A for A.S. Roma and F.C. Catanzaro. He was the pillar of Roma's defence, together with Francesco Rocca for 8 seasons in the 1970s.

Honours
 Coppa Italia winner: 1979/80.

References

1953 births
Living people
People from Palestrina
Italian footballers
Italy under-21 international footballers
Serie A players
A.S. Roma players
U.S. Catanzaro 1929 players
Ternana Calcio players

Association football defenders
Footballers from Lazio
Sportspeople from the Metropolitan City of Rome Capital